Mountains is the third album by British rock band Steamhammer. Steamhammer recorded this album as a quartet, Kieran White (vocals, guitar, harmonica), Martin Pugh (guitar), Steve Davy (bass) and Mick Bradley (drums) in mid-1970.

"Riding on the L&N" and "Hold That Train" were recorded live at the Lyceum Theatre in London.

Track listing (original release) 
All songs written by Kieran White, except where noted.
 "I Wouldn't Have Thought (Gophers Song)" (White, Martin Pugh)
 "Levinia"
 "Henry Lane"
 "Walking Down the Road"
 "Mountains"
 "Leader of the Ring"
 "Riding on the L&N"* (Dan Burley, Lionel Hampton)
 "Hold That Train"* (White, Pugh, Mick Bradley, Steve Davy)

*Recorded live at the Lyceum Theatre, London.

Personnel

Band members
Kieran White - lead vocals, acoustic and rhythm guitar, harmonica
Martin Pugh - lead, acoustic and slide guitars
Steve Davy - bass, backing vocals, organ
Mick Bradley - drums, percussion

Additional musicians
 Keith Nelson - banjo (3)

Additional personnel
Fritz Fryer - producer.
Martin Birch - recording and mixing engineer.

References

External links
 Crotchbat information
 Steamhammer official website by Martin Pugh

Steamhammer (band) albums
1970 albums
Columbia Records albums
B&C Records albums
Repertoire Records albums